Gang Signs & Prayer is the debut studio album by British rapper Stormzy. It was released on 24 February 2017 independently through #Merky Records while being distributed by ADA of Warner Music Group. It is Stormzy's first major commercial release, following the Dreamers Disease EP (2014). The album features guest appearances from fellow MCs Wretch 32, Ghetts and J Hus, along with singers Kehlani, Raleigh Ritchie and MNEK. It features production from Fraser T. Smith and Sir Spyro, among others.

After gaining attention on the UK underground music scene via his Wicked Skengman series of freestyles over classic grime beats, Stormzy released his debut EP Dreamers Disease independently in July 2014. In September 2015, he released a final instalment to his "WickedSkengMan" freestyle series, "WickedSkengMan 4", onto iTunes. After a year's hiatus from social media to focus on the recording of the album, Stormzy returned in early February 2017 via a series of advertising hoarding campaigns across London displaying lyrical quotes and the hashtag #GSAP 24.02. Gang Signs & Prayer was supported by the lead single "Big for Your Boots".

Gang Signs & Prayer received critical acclaim upon release, and entered the UK Albums Chart at number one with sales of over 68,000 copies, becoming the first grime album in history to reach number one. It also charted in twelve other countries. Gang Signs & Prayer holds the distinction of having every song from the album appear concurrently in the UK Singles Chart, including seven songs in the top 40. The album is certified Platinum by the British Phonographic Industry (BPI). Gang Signs & Prayer won British Album of the Year at the 2018 Brit Awards.

Background
After gaining attention on the UK underground music scene via his Wicked Skengman series of freestyles over classic grime beats, Stormzy released his debut EP Dreamers Disease independently in July 2014.

In March 2015, he released the single "Know Me From", which entered the UK Singles Chart at number 49. In September 2015, he released a final instalment to his "WickedSkengMan" freestyle series, "WickedSkengMan 4", onto iTunes, along with a studio version of his "Shut Up" freestyle over XTC's Functions on the Low instrumental. The track debuted at number 18 in the UK Singles Chart, becoming Stormzy's first top 40 hit. The online video for "Shut Up" gained millions of views and attention from the mainstream. As a result, Stormzy launched a Christmas number one campaign to get the song to number one, ultimately peaking at number eight in the UK Singles Chart.

After a year's hiatus from social media to focus on the recording of the album, Stormzy returned in early February 2017 via a series of advertising hoarding campaigns across London displaying lyrical quotes and the hashtag #GSAP 24.02. The album title was announced to be Gang Signs & Prayer, set to be released on 24 February 2017, followed by the track listing the following day.

Promotion
Prior to the album's official announcement, the non-album track "Shut Up" was released in September 2015 and ultimately included as the penultimate track on Gang Signs & Prayer. The non-album single "Scary" was released in April 2016 prior to Stormzy's hiatus. On 1 February 2017, an advertising hoarding campaign that foreshadowed the release of the album was launched in numerous areas in London.

Singles
"Big for Your Boots" was released as the album's lead single on 3 February 2017. The track was produced by Fraser T Smith and Sir Spyro. It entered the UK Singles Chart at number eight, reaching a peak of number six in its fourth week of charting after the release of Gang Signs & Prayer. It thus surpassed "Shut Up" as Stormzy's highest-charting single. "Cold" was released as the album's second single on 12 March, following the album's being certified Gold in the United Kingdom. "Cigarettes & Cush" was released as the album's third single on 29 August 2017. "Blinded by Your Grace, Pt. 2" was released as the album's fourth single on 27 October 2017.

Critical reception

Upon its release, Gang Signs & Prayer received widespread acclaim from critics. At Metacritic, which assigns a normalized rating out of 100 to reviews from mainstream publications, the album received an average score of 82, based on 19 reviews. Giving it a perfect score, Jordan Bassett of NME stated that Stormzy "delivers a knockout debut that’s brash and pensive in equal measure."

Alexis Petridis of The Guardian praised the musical diversity of the album: "More startling, however, is the confidence with which other tracks shift into unexpected musical territory. On paper, a rapper like Stormzy recording a lo-fi, electric piano-led, Stevie Wonderesque gospel track called '"Blinded By Your Grace, Pt 1" sounds like a textbook case of an artist overstretching himself; in reality, it’s fantastic, and oddly moving.", concluding that "It’s not a perfect debut – it’s slightly too long for one thing, and there are a couple of points where it sags – but it sounds like an album teeming with original, daring ideas. More importantly, it sounds like the work of an artist with the confidence and the talent to pull those ideas off."

Accolades

Commercial performance
After receiving close competition with Rag'n'Bone Man's Human, Gang Signs & Prayer entered the UK Albums Chart at number one, with combined sales of 68,594 copies. It set British streaming records for the most first-week streams for a number one album in chart history, with 13.9 million streams, surpassing the opening week stream count of Drake's Views. Gang Signs & Prayer became the first grime album to chart at number one, as well as joining the likes of Skepta and Giggs of charting in the top five independently. The album also charted at number one on the UK Independent Chart, UK R&B Chart and the Irish Albums Chart, number two on the Scottish Albums Chart. Outside the UK, it entered the Official New Zealand Music Chart at number 14 and Sverigetopplistan at number 34.

In the album's first week of release, seven tracks from Gang Signs & Prayer were in the top 40 of the UK Singles Chart – "Big for Your Boots", "Cold", "Bad Boys", "First Things First", "Mr Skeng", "Cigarettes & Cush" and "Shut Up". All sixteen tracks from the album appeared in the top 100 in a single week, making Stormzy the fourth artist to achieve this.

Gang Signs & Prayer was certified Silver by the BPI in its first week of release.

Track listing

Sample credits 
 "Big for Your Boots" contains a sample of "House Train" by Risse.
 "Velvet / Jenny Francis (Interlude)" contains a sample of "Intro (Like Velvet)" by Nao.
 "Return of the Rucksack" interpolates lyrics from "Seems 2 Be" by Dizzee Rascal.
 "Lay Me Bare" contains a sample of "Last Stand" by Kwabs.

Personnel
Vocals

 Stormzy – vocals
 MNEK – vocals
 Raleigh Ritchie – vocals
 Kehlani – vocals
 Lily Allen – vocals
 Wretch 32 – vocals
 J Hus – vocals, backing vocals
 Yasmin Green – vocals
 Sleeks – backing vocals
 Rasul A-Salaam – arranger, vocals
 Keesha Gumbs – vocals
 Babatunde "Soye" Soyebo – vocals
 Monet Ulerio – vocals
 Jenny Francis – spoken word
 Crazy Titch – spoken word
 Mama Stormz – spoken word
 LaDonna Harley-Peters – backing vocals
 Phebe Edwards – backing vocals
 J Warner – backing vocals
 Kenneth Asomani – backing vocals
 Flipz – backing vocals
 Rimes – backing vocals
 Moses Samuels – backing vocals

Instruments

 Rosie Danvers – orchestration, cello
 Ruth O'Reilly – French horn
 Corinne Bailey – French horn
 Mike Lovat – trumpet
 Andy Greenwood – trumpet
 Paul Spong – trumpet
 Dave Stewart – trombone
 Ed Tarrant – trombone
 Owen Slade – tuba
 Simon Haram – saxophone
 Martin Williams – saxophone
 Lydia Griffiths – oboe
 Louise Chapman – bassoon
 Patrick Kiernan – violin
 Hayley Pomfrett – violin
 Debbie Widdup – violin
 Eleanor Mathieson – violin
 Jenny Sacha – violin
 Anna Croad – violin
 Kotono Sato – violin
 Natalia Bonner – violin
 Sally Jackson – violin
 Emma Owens – viola
 Becky Jones – viola
 Nozomi Cohen – viola
 Bryony James – cello
 Richard Pryce – double bass
 Camilla Pay – harp
 Ben Epstein – bass guitar
 Dexter Hercules – drums
 Stormzy – keyboards, piano
 Adam Wakeman – hammond

Production

 Fraser T Smith – producer, mixer, programming, guitar, bass guitar, piano, keys, percussion
 Manon Grandjean – mixer, engineer
 Nick Taylor – engineer
 Tom Coyne – mastering engineer
 Randy Merrill – mastering engineer
 Bryan Wilson – engineer
 Mura Masa – producer, programming
 Swifta Beater – producer, programming
 EY [Eyobed Getachew] – producer, programming
 P2J [Richard Isong] - producer, programming
 Sons of Sonix – production, programming
 Sir Spyro – producer, keyboards, programming
 Sunny Kale – producer, programming
 Wizzy Wow AKA Isra Lohata – producers, programming
 169 – bass programming
 6Sixx – producer, programming, mixer
 Scott Jacoby – recording engineer

Charts

Weekly charts

Year-end charts

Certifications

Release history

References 

2017 debut albums
Stormzy albums
Albums produced by Mura Masa
Albums produced by Fraser T. Smith
Brit Award for British Album of the Year